Lindsay Kennedy-Eversmeyer (born February 24, 1980) is the first woman to play in the Major Indoor Soccer League (MISL) and fourth to play for a men's professional indoor soccer team. In February 2005, she made her debut for the St. Louis Steamers during the last minute of the match against the Milwaukee Wave. The team signed her to a five-game contract following her appearance.

Notes

References

1980 births
Living people
American women's soccer players
St. Louis Steamers (2003–2006 MISL) players
Harris–Stowe State University alumni
Kansas Jayhawks women's soccer players
Soccer players from St. Louis
Major Indoor Soccer League (2001–2008) players
Women's association football forwards
Women's Premier Soccer League players
UMSL Tritons coaches